The 1974 Australian Open was a tennis tournament played on outdoor grass courts at the Kooyong Lawn Tennis Club in Melbourne in Australia and was held from 26 December 1973 to 1 January 1974.  It was the 62nd edition of the Australian Open and the first Grand Slam tournament of the year.

Seniors

Men's singles

 Jimmy Connors defeated  Phil Dent, 7–6(9–7), 6–4, 4–6, 6–3

Women's singles

 Evonne Goolagong defeated  Chris Evert, 7–6, 4–6, 6–0

Men's doubles

 Ross Case /  Geoff Masters defeated  Syd Ball /  Bob Giltinan, 3–6, 7–6, 6–2

Women's doubles

 Evonne Goolagong /  Peggy Michel defeated  Kerry Harris /  Kerry Melville, 7–5, 6–3

Mixed doubles
Competition not held between 1970 and 1986.

References

External links
 Australian Open official website

 
 

 
 
December 1973 sports events in Australia
January 1974 sports events in Australia
1974,Australian Open